Bijjaragi is a village in the State of Karnataka, India. It is located in Vijayapur taluk of Vijayapur district, Karnataka.

Demographics
As per the Population Census 2011, there are a total of 1,532 families residing in the village. The total population of Bijjaragi is 8,073, out of which 4,218 are males and 3,855 are females (thus the average sex ratio of Bijjaragi is 914:1000).

Geography
The village is situated geographically at 16°54'46.7"N north latitude and 75°26'30.3"E east longitude.

Agriculture
The village mainly grows grapes. Maize and sorghum (jawar), as well as small amounts of pomegranate, lemons, onions, and turmeric are also grown. Irrigation occurs via water canals and wells.

River
Doni River is the nearest river, and flows close to the village during rainy season for a month or two.

Economy
Farming and agriculture-related business is the main occupation for many people in the village.
The cropping pattern in the village reveals that food crops like jowar, maize, bajra and wheat among cereals, red gram, Bengal gram and green gram among pulses are major crops cultivated in the village. The major oilseed crops are sunflower, groundnut and safflower. Horticulture crops like grapes, pomegranate, ber, guava sapota, lime are also grown.

Notable people 
 Bhāskara II - It is believed that Bhaskaracharya II, Indian mathematician and astronomer (1114–1185) was born in Bijjargi village. 
 Shri Siddeshwar Swamiji of Jnanayogashram Bijapur was born in Bijjaragi village on 24 October 1941

Transportation
SH-12 passes through Tikota from Jevargi to Miraj via Bijapur.

Literacy rate
As per the Census 2011, the literacy rate of Bijjaragi is 69.1%, which is higher than the 57.3% of Bijapur district as a whole. The male literacy rate is 78.7% and the female literacy rate is 58.55% in Bijjaragi village.

Politics
Bijjargi village has a gram panchayat under the Assembly Constituency for Babaleshwar in Bijapur District. Nationally, it is a part of the Bijapur Lok Sabha constituency.

Climate and Temperature

The village has a semi-arid climate. It has an average elevation of 606 metres (1988 ft) above sea level.

References

External links
Welcome to Vijayapur

Villages in Bijapur district, Karnataka